The Kula, also known as the Kurnu, were an indigenous Australian people of the state of New South Wales.

Country
They were also around the Warrego River and at Enngonia and Barringun on the border with Queensland. Their western reach ran close to Yantabulla.

Alternative names
 Cornu
 Gu:nu
 Guemo
 Guno, Gunu
 Komu
 Koonoo
 Kornoo
 Kumu (language name applied to the Kula but also to other Darling River tribes)
 Kuno
 Noolulgo

Source:

Some words
 thirlta (kangaroo)
 karle/kulli (dog)

Notes

Citations

Sources

Aboriginal peoples of New South Wales